Antonio Pío González-Saravia Mollinedo (b. 11 July 1743 Salamanca - d. 2 December, 1812 Oaxaca) was a Peninsular Spanish noble and Spanish loyalist Lt. General during the Mexican War of Independence. He is best known for his command over the defenses of the city of Oaxaca in 1812 when the Mexican insurgents under José María Morelos y Pavón captured the city for the independence movement.

References

Bibliography

External links 

 

1743 births
1812 deaths
History of Oaxaca
Spanish untitled nobility
Spanish generals